The Macquarie Island Marine Park (previously known as the Macquarie Island Commonwealth Marine Reserve) is an Australian marine park near Macquarie Island in the southwest Pacific. It is the largest of the 14 parks managed under the South-east Marine Parks Network.

Conservation values
Examples of ecosystems, habitats and communities associated with the Macquarie Province and associated with the sea-floor features: abyssal plain/deep ocean floor, canyon, escarpment, knoll/abyssal hill, ridge, slope and trench/trough
Important foraging area for: killer whale, southern elephant seal, Antarctic, Subantarctic and New Zealand fur seals, royal, king, rockhopper and gentoo penguin and wandering albatross.

History
The Marine Park was originally proclaimed on 20 October 1999 as the Macquarie Island Marine Park. The name of the reserve was later changed on 28 June 2007 to the Macquarie Island Commonwealth marine reserve. The name was changed again in 2017 back to Macquarie Island Marine Park.

Summary of protection zones
The Macquarie Island Marine Park has been assigned IUCN protected area category IV. However, within the marine park there are two protection zones, each zone has an IUCN category and related rules for managing activities to ensure the protection of marine habitats and species.

The following table is a summary of the zoning rules within the Macquarie Island Marine Park:

See also

 Protected areas managed by the Australian government

References

External links
 South-east Marine Parks Network - Parks Australia
 South-east Marine Commonwealth Marine Reserves Network - environment.gov.au (outdated)

Australian marine parks